Motithang is a north-western suburb of Thimphu, Bhutan. The Chubachu River divides the district from Kawajangsa further north and Chubachu district lies to the east.

Meaning "the meadow of pearls", the area only developed as a residential area in the 1980s, following the initial establishment of the Motithang Hotel in 1974, on the occasion of the coronation of Jigme Singye Wangchuck. At the time, the hotel was located in the middle of forest, separated from the city by farmland but today this area has grown up with houses and gardens. 

Aside from the Motithang Hotel, the district contains several notable state guest houses such as the Kungacholing and Lhundupling, Rapten Apartments and the Amankora Thimphu. It also contains the National Commission for Cultural Affairs, a UNICEF station and several grocery stores, including the Lhatshog supermarket. Schools include Motithang Higher Secondary School and Jigme Namgyal School.

There is also a notable takin wildlife sanctuary in the district, named Motithang Takin Preserve.

References

Thimphu